Colonial Warehouse is a building located in Minneapolis, Minnesota, United States.

History
Constructed in 1885, Colonial Warehouse is rich in history and is part of Minneapolis' Historic Warehouse District. Formally known as the Minneapolis Street Railway Company Building, the property now bears the name Colonial Warehouse.  The warehouse was intended to be the powerhouse for a cable car system that was never built. Instead it became an electric carhouse, and the first electric powerhouse for streetcars in 1890. The building housed the general offices and the paint and woodworking shops during the horse-drawn streetcar era.  Thomas Lowry, the Head of the Minneapolis Street Railway Company, chose this site as the firm’s headquarters.  It became the main offices of the Minneapolis Street Railway Company until 1904.

References

Buildings and structures in Minneapolis